The applause sign is a behavioral pattern used to diagnose neurodegenerative diseases.

Description
The applause sign is gauged through performance of a three-clap test, where a patient is asked to clap three times. Failure to clap exactly three times is correlated with neurodegenerative disorders. Historically it has been used to specifically diagnose progressive supranuclear palsy, but it has also been reported as a sign of corticobasal degeneration, Parkinson's disease, and other neurodegenerative diseases.

References

Medical tests
Memory tests
Cognitive impairment and dementia screening and assessment tools
Cognitive tests